Eric Noel Porter Goff was an Anglican priest.

He was born on Christmas Eve 1902, educated at Trinity College, Dublin and ordained in 1927. In 1939 he became Provost  of Portsmouth. He resigned in 1972 and died on  4 April 1981. His clerical career ended in sad circumstances.

References

1902 births
Alumni of Trinity College Dublin
Provosts and Deans of Portsmouth
1981 deaths